"I Still Love You" is a song by freestyle singer Lil Suzy and was released as the third single from her album Paradise in 1998. The song is the only ballad released as a single from the album. On November 28, 1998, the single reached No. 94 on the Billboard Hot 100.

Track listing
 US 12" single

Charts

References

1998 singles
Lil Suzy songs
1998 songs